Events from the year 1645 in Ireland.

Incumbent
Monarch: Charles I

Events
 Irish Confederate Wars: Lismore town and castle are sacked by a force of the Irish Confederacy commanded by Lord Castlehaven.
January 20–March 18 – Siege of Duncannon: Confederate general Thomas Preston takes Duncannon.
April 23 (Saint George's Day) – English Civil War: one hundred and fifty Irish soldiers bound for service with King Charles I of England are captured at sea by Parliamentarians and killed at Pembroke in Wales.
October 27 – Catholic Bishop Malachy Ó Caollaidhe is killed by Scottish forces during a Confederate expedition to Sligo.
The Society of Jesus establishes a school in Galway, the predecessor of Coláiste Iognáid.

Arts and literature
Henry Burkhead's closet drama Cola's Fury, or Lirenda's Misery, based on the Irish Rebellion of 1641, is written.
John Colgan's Acta Sanctorum Hiberniae is published in Leuven.

Births

Deaths
Richard III de Bermingham, Anglo-Irish landowner (b. 1570)
Peter Martin (STP), Dominican.
Muiris mac Torna Ó Maolconaire, scribe and poet.

References

1640s in Ireland
Years of the 17th century in Ireland